Elizabeth Bourland (born August 13, 1963, née Jagush) is a sport shooter who has competed for Costa Rica and the United States in international events. She participated in the Summer Olympics in 1984 for Costa Rica and 1996 for the United States.

Olympic results

References

1963 births
Living people
ISSF rifle shooters
Costa Rican female sport shooters
American female sport shooters
Shooters at the 1984 Summer Olympics
Shooters at the 1996 Summer Olympics
Olympic shooters of Costa Rica
Olympic shooters of the United States
Pan American Games medalists in shooting
Pan American Games gold medalists for the United States
Pan American Games silver medalists for the United States
Shooters at the 1995 Pan American Games
Medalists at the 1995 Pan American Games
21st-century American women
Sportspeople from San José, Costa Rica